Joseph Colaneri is an American conductor.

Career
From 1987 to 1998, he was a conductor with the New York City Opera. He has been a member of the conducting staff at the Metropolitan Opera since 1998, and as of 2014 has conducted more than 35 performances for the company. He was the artistic director of the opera program at the Mannes School of Music for 20 years.

In 1993, Colaneri conducted the world premiere of Hugo Weisgall's opera Esther at the New York City Opera. In 1995, he led the American premiere of Toshiro Mayuzumi's 1976 opera Kinkaku-ji at the same venue.

West Australian Opera announced in January 2012 that Colaneri would take up the position of artistic director of the company, succeeding Richard Mills, who moved to Victorian Opera after holding that position for 15 years. In 2014, Colaneri announced that he would not renew his contract. In 2013, the Glimmerglass Festival, an opera and theater company in Cooperstown, New York, announced that Colaneri has been named its new music director. In 2017, he made his Juilliard Orchestra debut.

References

External links

Living people
Year of birth missing (living people)
Place of birth missing (living people)
American male conductors (music)
Mannes College The New School for Music faculty
American artistic directors
20th-century American conductors (music)
21st-century American conductors (music)
Metropolitan Opera people
20th-century American male musicians
21st-century American male musicians